William Baillie, Lord Provand (died 26 May 1593) was a Scottish judge from Lamington.

Career
He first appears as a judge of the court of session, 15 November 1550. In March 1567 Mary, Queen of Scots granted her "well-beloved clerk and counsellor" the reward of a 19 lease or tack of her incomes from the Parsonage of Glasgow and the lands of Provand.

He was appointed president of the court on the death of John Sinclair, Bishop of Brechin, in 1566. On 6 December 1567, he was deprived of this office, in favour of Sir James Balfour, by Regent Moray, on the pretext that the act of institution required it to be held by a person of the spiritual estate. Balfour was in turn removed in 1568, when he was accused of participation in Darnley's murder, and Baillie, being reinstated, held the office till his death, 26 May 1593.

In November 1586, Baillie wrote to Archibald Douglas, the Scottish ambassador in London, hoping to get compensation for some merchandise which had been stolen by pirates. He mentioned that his wife, Elizabeth Durham, and her father, perhaps Alexander Durham (younger), sent their kind regards.

Provan Hall
After the Scottish Reformation, Provan Hall near Glasgow became a residence of William Baillie. In 1566 he was a collector of the teinds or tithes known as the "Thirds of Benefices" for the parsonage of Glasgow. As a judge, he was known as Lord Provand. He married Elizabeth Durham. Their daughter and heiress of Provan, Elizabeth Baillie, married Robert Hamilton, a son of Andrew Hamilton of Goslington. She passed the ownership of Provan Hall to their eldest son, Francis Hamilton of Silvertonhill in 1599.

References

Year of birth missing
1593 deaths
16th-century Scottish people
Provand
Lords President of the Court of Session
16th-century Scottish judges